Aaron Wright may refer to:

 Aaron Wright (cricketer) (born 1997), Irish cricketer
 Aaron Abel Wright (1840–1922), Canadian politician

See also
 Aron Wright (1810–1885), American physician and educator